Pseudecheneis sulcata, the sucker throat catfish, is a species of sisorid catfish found in India, Nepal and Bangladesh in Asia..This species reaches a length of .

References

Zhou, W., X. Li and Y. Yang, 2008. A review of the catfish genus Pseudecheneis (Siluriformes: Sisoridae) from China, with the description of four new species from Yunnan. Raffles Bull. Zool. 56(1):107-124.

Catfish of Asia
Fish of India
Taxa named by John McClelland (doctor)
Fish described in 1842
Sisoridae